The Institute for Problems of Cryobiology and Cryomedicine in Kharkiv is one of the institutes of the National Academy of Science of Ukraine, and is the largest institute devoted to cryobiology research in the world.

Background
Established in 1972, the focus of  the research is on cryoinjury, cryosurgery, cryopreservation, lyophilization and hypothermia. Since 1985 the Institute has published  the open access peer-reviewed  scientific journal Problems of Cryobiology and Cryomedicine.

See also 
Cryobiology
National Academy of Science of Ukraine

References

External links
 Institute for Problems of Cryobiology and Cryomedicine
 Problems of Cryobiology and Cryomedicine (journal)

Cryobiology
Research institutes in Ukraine
Universities and institutes established in the Soviet Union
Medical research institutes in the Soviet Union
Biological research institutes
Medical and health organizations based in Ukraine